"How Come You Never Go There" is the only single from Feist's 2011 album, Metals.

An accompanying music video, filmed in New Zealand, was released on November 17, 2011.

Musicians
Feist - vocals, guitar
Mocky - electric bass
Chilly Gonzales - piano
Brian LeBarton - drums
Colin Stetson - tenor and baritone sax, French horn, trumpet
Evan Cranley - trombone, euphonium
The Real Vocal String Quartet - group vocals

Charts

Weekly charts

References

External links

2011 singles
Feist (singer) songs
2011 songs
Interscope Records singles
Songs written by Feist (singer)